The Badalona Dracs ("Badalona Dragons") are a gridiron football team based in Badalona, Catalonia.

History
Three American football enthusiasts got together in Badalona on a December 1987's evening to found the team. They were Pere Moliner, first president of the team, Ramón Ventura and Italian Alfonso Genchi. The team was founded as Badalona Drags. Just a few months later, the team was established and the first ever American football game played in Spain was set for March 19th, 1988. Badalona Dracs played Palermo Cardinals (Italy), with a score of 18–12 for the Italians. Later on, the first organized league in Spain was created with the Dracs joining three other teams, L'Hospitalet Pioners, Barcelona Búfals and the defunct Barcelona Boxers. Badalona Dracs won the competition. It was just the first of many championships.

After the 2004 season the team changed names to Badalona Dracs.

The Dracs won the last four Spanish titles. With a total of ten LNFA titles they have the best championship record in Spain.

Honours

National
 Spanish League (11): 1998, 1999, 2002, 2003, 2004, 2014, 2016, 2017, 2018, 2019, 2021
 Spanish Cup (6): 1999, 2004, 2017, 2018, 2019, 2021

Regional
 Catalan League (1): 1988
 Catalan Cup (11): 2003, 2010, 2011, 2012, 2013, 2014, 2015, 2016, 2017, 2020, 2021

References

External links 

American football teams established in 1987
1987 establishments in Spain
American football teams in Catalonia
Sport in Badalona
1987 establishments in Catalonia